"Vild & skild" is a song written by Magnus Uggla, and recorded by him on his 2007 album Pärlor åt svinen. It was released as a single the same year.

The song became a Svensktoppen success, where it stayed for 9 weeks between 13 January.-9 March 2008, before leaving the chart, peaking at number seven. The song also peaked at number 50 on the Swedish Singles Chart.

Charts

References

2007 songs
2007 singles
Magnus Uggla songs
Songs written by Magnus Uggla
Swedish-language songs